This is a list of cities and towns in Guinea.

Cities 
Beyla
Boffa
Boké
Conakry (capital)
Coyah
Dabola
Dalaba
Dinguiraye
Dubréka
Faranah
Forécariah
Fria
Gaoual
Guéckédou
Kankan
Kérouané
Kindia
Kissidougou
Koubia
Koundara
Kouroussa
Labé
Lélouma
Lola
Macenta
Mandiana
Mali
Mamou
Nzérékoré
Pita
Siguiri  
Télimélé
Timbo
Tougué
Yomou
Wheek

Top 10 most populous cities

See also
 Urban planning in Africa: Guinea

References

External links

 
Cities
Guinea, List of cities in
Guinea